Leukomyelitis, also known as acute spasmodic paraplegia, is a disorder of the central nervous system. It affects only the "white matter" of the spinal cord.

Leukomyelitis has been in animals such as rats, sheep and goats, as well as humans.

References

Myelin disorders
Central nervous system disorders